Indulf, also known as Gundulf, was a Byzantine mercenary who defected to the Ostrogoths and became a leader in their army in the last years of the Gothic War of 535–554.

Indulf is first mentioned, by the historian Procopius, as a barbarian (in all probability a Goth) bodyguard of the Byzantine general Belisarius. When Belisarius departed Italy in early 549, Indulf remained behind, and soon after joined the Goths. In late spring/early summer of 549, the Ostrogoth king Totila (r. 541–552) entrusted him with a large army and a fleet, and sent him to campaign in Dalmatia, which the Byzantines had taken in 535/536. There, he used his known association with Belisarius to capture the fortified towns of Movicurum and Laureate, whose inhabitants had not learned of his volte-face. Indulf killed the inhabitants and plundered the two settlements and the surrounding countryside. He also defeated a Byzantine force sent against him by the local Byzantine governor and captured a number of supply ships destined for the Byzantine army in Italy, before returning with his men to Italy.

Indulf reappears in 551, when he was one of the three Gothic generals entrusted with besieging and capturing Ancona. When a Byzantine relief force sailed against them, Indulf and his fellow-general Gibal headed the fleet that confronted them. The resulting Battle of Sena Gallica was a disaster for the inexperienced Goths; Gibal fell and most of the ships were sunk or captured, but Indulf was able to escape with 11 vessels. Upon reaching land, the Goths burned their ships, and quickly abandoned the siege of Ancona, taking refuge in Auximum. Indulf makes a last appearance in Procopius's narrative after the Gothic defeat at the Battle of Mons Lactarius, where he was one of the leaders of the remnants of the Gothic army that refused to surrender and instead marched north to Ticinum.

References

Sources

6th-century deaths
6th-century Ostrogothic people
6th-century Byzantine people
Byzantine defectors
Gothic warriors
History of Dalmatia
People of the Gothic War (535–554)
Year of birth unknown